Amar Prasad Ray was an Indian physician and malariologist. Born in 1913, he specialized in community health and the management of Malaria epidemic in India. He was an elected fellow (1962) of the Indian National Science Academy and a recipient of the 1974 World Health Organization Governance Award. He was honoured by the Government of India in 1967, with the award of Padma Shri, the fourth highest Indian civilian award for his contributions to the society. He was married to Kalyani Ray and had three children.

References

Recipients of the Padma Shri in medicine
1913 births
Date of death missing
20th-century Indian medical doctors
Indian Medical Service officers
Malariologists
Fellows of the Indian National Science Academy
Indian tropical physicians
The Darling Foundation Prize laureates